Priyadarshini Engineering College, Vaniyambadi is an engineering college in Tamil Nadu, India. It is located at Vaniyambadi, Tirupattur District of Tamil Nadu.

Priyadarshini Engineering College, the flagship of Jai Barath Charitable Trust, was established in 1995 at Vaniyambadi in Tirupattur District of Tamil Nadu. The College has been approved by All India Council for Technical Education, New Delhi and Permanently affiliated to Anna University, Chennai.

Courses

Under Graduate	       
B.E. – Computer Science and Engineering              
B.E. – Electronics and Communication Engineering	
B.E. – Electrical and Electronics Engineering	       
B.E. – Mechanical Engineering	                    
B.E. – Civil Engineering	  
B.Tech. – Information Technology

Post Graduate
M.E. – Engineering Design
M.E. – Power Systems
M.E. – Computer Science and Engineering
M.E. – Communication Systems
Master of Computer Application (M.C.A.)
Master of Business Administration (M.B.A.)

Library

Central Library in an area of 1114 sq.m. The library has 48,652 books with 11,087 titles. The library subscribes to 65 national and 61 international journals, eight magazines, and six newspapers. It contains 1524 back volumes of journals and 243 CD ROMs. Books are classified and arranged according to the Universally Decimal Classification (UDC) scheme. The library has an institutional membership with the DELNET access. The library subscribed e–resources are available per AICTE MANDATORY subscribing IEEE, and ASME. In addition to this, departments have their own departmental library. All students of management studies are provided with four news papers daily. These are: Business Line, Business Standard, Economic Times and Financial Express. The online Public Access catalogue (OPAC) is available. The college intends to provide the NPTEL (National Program Technology Enhanced Learning) through online web and web video courses in engineering and humanities stream.

Professional Societies Chapters

Computer Society of India (CSI)
Institute of Electrical and Electronics Engineers(IEEE)
Indian Society for Technical Education (ISTE)
ICT Academy of Tamil Nadu(ICTACT)
The Institution Of Electronics And Telecommunication Engineers(IETE)
National Cyber Safety and Security Standards (NCSSS)
The Institution of Engineers (India)

External links
Priyadarshini Engineering College Official website

Engineering colleges in Tamil Nadu
Colleges affiliated to Anna University
Universities and colleges in Vellore district
Educational institutions established in 1995
1995 establishments in Tamil Nadu